The 1991 Arizona State Sun Devils football team was an American football team that represented Arizona State University in the Pacific-10 Conference (Pac-10) during the 1991 NCAA Division I-A football season. In their fourth season under head coach Larry Marmie, the Sun Devils compiled a 6–5 record (4–4 against Pac-10 opponents), finished in fifth place in the Pac-10, and outscored their opponents by a combined total of 218 to 210.

The team's statistical leaders included Bret Powers with 1,500 passing yards, George Montgomery with 475 rushing yards, and Eric Guliford with 801 receiving yards.

Schedule

Personnel

References

Arizona State
Arizona State Sun Devils football seasons
Arizona State Sun Devils football